The following is an alphabetical list of Sri Lankan poets.



A
 Karunaratne Abeysekera
Padikara Muhandiram Don Pedris Francis Abeywickrama
 Arisen Ahubudu
 Gunadasa Amarasekara
 Jean Arasanayagam
 M. H. M. Ashraff

B
 Chandrarathna Bandara

F
 Basil Fernando

G
 Siri Gunasinghe
 Gurulugomi

I
 Eric Illayapparachchi

J
 Marcelline Jayakody

K
 Piyasena Kahandagamage
 Sirilal Kodikara
 Parakrama Kodituwakku
 H. M. Kudaligama
 Wimalaratne Kumaragama

M
 S. Mahinda
 Sri Chandraratne Manawasinghe
 Carl Muller
 Kumaratunga Munidasa

N
 Gajaman Nona

P
 Sagara Palansuriya
 Vicumpriya Perera
 Eelattu Poothanthevanar
 Meemana Premathilake

R
 Thotagamuwe Sri Rahula Thera
 Monica Ruwanpathirana

S
 Ediriweera Sarachchandra
 Mahagama Sekera
 G. B. Senanayake
 P. K. D. Seneviratne
 Lakdhas Wikkrama Sinha
 Denagama Siriwardena
 Regi Siriwardena
 Richard Lionel Spittel

T
Saman Tilakasiri

V
 Vivimarie Vanderpoorten

W
 Asoka Weerasinghe
 Nancy Wijekoon
 Nissanka Wijeyeratne

See also

Sri Lankan poets
Poets
Sri Lankan